Andrea Bright Cossu (born August 15, 1984) is a Nigerian footballer, who currently plays for Norcia 480 in the Italian Prima Categoria as a midfielder. He also holds Italian citizenship.

Biography

Early life
Cossu was born in the Nigerian city of Buguma. The Cossu family immigrated 1990 to Italian city Foligno from his native Nigeria.

Career
Coassu left for Giulianova in 2002–03 season and returned to Ternana in January 2003. In January 2006 he was signed by Triestina. In the 2007–08 season he was loaned to Paganese.

Universitatea Craiova
In February 2011, Andrea Cossu signed a contract with the Romanian club FC Universitatea Craiova of Liga 1.

Personal life
Andrea's brother, Riccardo, plays currently football for A.C.D. Austis.

References

External links
Lega Calcio - Cossu, Andrea 

1984 births
Living people
Sportspeople from Rivers State
Nigerian footballers
Liga I players
A.S.D. Città di Foligno 1928 players
U.S. Triestina Calcio 1918 players
Paganese Calcio 1926 players
S.S. Virtus Lanciano 1924 players
FC U Craiova 1948 players
A.C. Ancona players
Association football midfielders
Nigerian expatriate footballers
Nigerian expatriate sportspeople in Italy
Expatriate footballers in Italy
Nigerian expatriate sportspeople in Romania
Expatriate footballers in Romania
Nigerian expatriate sportspeople in Switzerland
Expatriate footballers in Switzerland
People with acquired Italian citizenship
Footballers from Rivers State
People from Buguma